Rully is the name of several communes in France:

Rully, Calvados, in the Calvados département 
Rully, Oise, in the Oise département 
Rully, Saône-et-Loire, in the Saône-et-Loire département 

Rully may also refer to:
Rully, the Lincolnshire name for a flat, four-wheeled horse dray with a back tail board